Arthur Ralph Thomas "Doc" Hillebrand (March 9, 1876 – December 14, 1941) was an American football and baseball player and coach. He played college football as a tackle for Princeton University.  Hillebrand served as head football coach at the United States Naval Academy from 1901 to 1902 and at his alma mater, Princeton, from 1903 to 1905, compiling a career college football coaching record of 35–15–2.  Hillebrand was also the head baseball coach at Navy and Princeton during the same years, tallying a career college baseball coaching mark of 65–31.  He was inducted into the College Football Hall of Fame as player in 1970.

Coaching career
Hillebrand was the ninth head football at the United States Naval Academy located in Annapolis, Maryland and he held that position for two seasons, from 1901 until 1902.  His coaching record at Navy was 8–11–2.

Head coaching record

Football

References

External links
 
 

1876 births
1941 deaths
19th-century players of American football
American football tackles
Navy Midshipmen baseball coaches
Navy Midshipmen football coaches
Princeton Tigers baseball coaches
Princeton Tigers baseball players
Princeton Tigers football coaches
Princeton Tigers football players
All-American college football players
College Football Hall of Fame inductees
People from Freeport, Illinois
Flandreau Indians players